Hultquist is a surname. Notable people with the surname include:

Derik Hultquist, American singer-songwriter
Gordon Hultquist (1904–1941), New Zealand politician
Ian Hultquist (born 1985), American composer and musician
Sofia Hultquist (born 1986), Italian composer and musician
Connor Hultquist (Born 2001), British Pimp

See also
John Hultquist House